is a Japanese voice actor from Hyōgo Prefecture. He is a member of Office Osawa, the same agency that employs distinguished voice actors such as Yuji Ueda, Mitsuo Iwata, and Fumihiko Tachiki. His name is sometimes mistranslated as Hitoshi Horikawa.

Notable voice roles
B'tX (1996) (B'TX)
Black Cat (2005) (Igor Planter)

Unknown date
Blue Dragon (Saber Tiger)
Daraku Tenshi - The Fallen Angels (Ruchio Roche)
Devil Lady (Man)
Fullmetal Alchemist (General Hakuro)
Fullmetal Alchemist: Brotherhood (Karley)
Gensomaden Saiyuki: Requiem movie (Specter)
Godannar (Shibakusa)
Hellsing TV  (Sir Peter Winfield; Test Subject
Initial D Fourth Stage (Akiyama Nobuhiko)
Super Robot Wars Original Generation series (TV) (Tetsuya Onodera)
Musashi Gundoh (Ronin)
Akumajo Dracula X: Rondo of Blood (Richter Belmont)
Wangan Midnight (Kijima Kouichi)
Wind: A Breath of Heart (Akihito Narukaze)

Dubbing
Kingmaker, Seo Chang-dae (Lee Sun-kyun)
Parasite, Park Dong-ik (Lee Sun-kyun)
Take Point, Dr. Yoon Ji-eui (Lee Sun-kyun)

External links

Sources

1962 births
Living people
Japanese male voice actors
Actors from Hyōgo Prefecture